Phon Songkhram railway station is a railway station located in Phon Songkhram Subdistrict, Non Sung District, Nakhon Ratchasima Province. The station was rebuilt in 2019 as part of the double tracking project between Thanon Chira Junction and Khon Kaen.

References 

Railway stations in Thailand
Nakhon Ratchasima province